Å is a small village and a parish in Norrköping Municipality, Östergötland County, Sweden. It has a population of about 200.

There are also at least 12 other places in Sweden called Å, most  of  them only a farm or a few houses. Å is pronounced .

Å, which means stream or small river, is a contender for the title of shortest place-name in the world — although other places named Å as well as Ö and Y can make the same claim. As a consequence, many tourists have ventured to the village for the sole purpose of either taking photos of or stealing the place-name sign.

The parish of Å is rich in ancient remains, of which the oldest date from the Stone Age.

References

Aa